Rhimphalea astrigalis is a small moth in the family Crambidae that is found in the mountains of Borneo and Thailand. The species was first described by George Hampson in 1898.

References
 Hampson, G. F. (1899). "A revision of the moths of the subfamily Pyraustinae and family Pyralidae, part 1". Proceedings of the Zoological Society of London. 1898(4):715, pl. 49 (XLIX)–fig.12.

External links
 - with images
Images at jpmoth.org

Moths described in 1898
Spilomelinae